Oi Polloi are a punk rock band from Scotland that formed around 1981. Starting as an Oi! band, they are now generally more associated with the anarcho-punk genre. The band has become notable for their contributions to the Scottish Gaelic punk subgenre. The name comes from the Greek expression "οἱ πολλοί", Anglicized hoi polloi, meaning "the masses" or "the common people".

The band has gone through about 50 members since their formation, and their only permanent member has been vocalist Deek Allen, who has also been involved in Gaelic-language television. The band has included punks and skinheads. The members have been supporters of Anti-Fascist Action and Earth First!, and they use the motto "No Compromise in Defence of Our Earth," which is an adaptation of Earth First!'s motto. They support direct action in defence of the environment, hunt sabotage, as well as resistance against racism, sexism, homophobia, fascism and imperialism.

Career

After gigs in the Edinburgh area and the recording of the band's self-recorded first cassette demo, Last of the Mohicans, drummer Stu "Doccy" Dunn left to become a karate instructor. A second studio demo, Green Anarchoi and their first vinyl EP, Resist the Atomic Menace, followed.

Oi Polloi started singing in Scottish Gaelic in 1996, recording the Carson? EP, (2003), then recording and releasing the full-length LP Ar Ceòl Ar Cànan Ar-A-Mach in 2006. The band members also use Scottish Gaelic in day-to-day communications.

In 2013, they collaborated with CLÀR, a Scottish Gaelic publisher, to launch Air Cuan Dubh Drilseach, a Gaelic science fiction novel by Tim Armstrong, the singer of Mill a h-Uile Rud, at events at Elvis Shakespeare on Leith Walk and on The Cruz Boat at the shore in Leith.

Discography

12" LPs
Skins 'N' Punks Volume Two (Split w Betrayed) 1986
Unlimited Genocide (Split w A.O.A.) 1986
Mad As... (Split w Toxik Ephex) 1987
Unite And Win (Oi! Records) 1987
In Defence of Our Earth (Words of Warning Records) 1990
You've Heard It All Before Track on The Crass Covers Compilation album (Ruptured Ambitions Records) 1993
Fight Back! (Re-Release of Old Split Material) 1994
Total Anarchoi (Live/Studio Collection – CD/LP) 1996
Fuaim Catha (Skuld Records) 1999
Outraged by the System (Step-1 Music) 2002
Heavenly Peace]' (split 12-inch EP w Nikmat Olalim, Campari Records) 2006Ar Ceòl Ar Cànan Ar-A-Mach (self release/Campari records/Nikt Nic Nie Wie) 2006Gaidhlig na Lasair (compilation of underground Gaelic punk and techno)(Problem? Records) 2006Total Resistance to the Fucking System (Plastic Bomb) 2008SS Politician (Chaosrurale Records/Active Rebellion) 2010Duisg! (Plastic Bomb/Active Rebellion) 2012Saorsa (Ruin Nation Records) 2016

7" EPsResist the Atomic Menace 1986 (re-released 1994)Outrage 1988Omnicide 1991 (Words of Warning Records)Guilty (Ruptured Ambitions Records) 1993Oi Polloi / Blownapart Bastards (Split) 1994Oi Polloi - s/t (Nikt Nic Nie Wie)Bare Faced Hypocrisy Sells Records The Anti-Chumbawamba EP w/Riot/Clone, The Bus Station Loonies, Anxiety Society, The Chineapple Punks, Love Chips and Peas, and Wat Tyler 1998 (Ruptured Ambitions Records)THC (Campary Rec.) 1998Let the Boots Do the Talking (Ruptured Ambitions Records) 1999Carson? (Nikt Nic Nie Wie) 2003Ceòl Gàidhlig mar Sgian nad Amhaich (compilation with Mill a h-Uile Rud, Atomgevitter and Nad Aislingean) (Problem Records) 2005Mind the Bollocks (Kämäset Levyt Records) 2007Cyklopen split EP with Kansalaistottelemattomuus 2010Split EP with Appalachian Terror Unit Profane Existence (US)/NNNW (Europe) 2011Split EP with Na Gathan (Limited May Tour Edition) Problem Records 2012

DVDOi Polloi: The Movie''

See also
 Mill a h-Uile Rud

References

External links

Live review by John Robb, Manchester July 2011
Article on Gaelic punk in The Scotsman newspaper 
Article in The Scotsman Gaelic page on Oi Polloi and their Ar Cànan, Ar Ceòl, Ar-a-mach LP
BBC Radio nan Gaidheal Rapal session February 2008 with 3 Gaelic tracks
Air Cuan Dubh Drilseach website – Tim Armstrong/CLAR literary collaboration

Anarcho-punk groups
Scottish Gaelic music
Oi! groups
Street punk groups
Skinhead
British anti-fascists
Musical groups established in 1981
Scottish punk rock groups
Musical groups from Edinburgh